Johnny Ray Holland (born March 11, 1965) is an American gridiron football coach and former player.  He is the linebackers coach for the San Francisco 49ers of the National Football League (NFL). Holland played in the NFL as a linebacker for the Green Bay Packers from 1987 to 1993.  He is an inductee into the Texas A&M Hall of Fame, the Cotton Bowl Hall of Fame, and the Green Bay Packers Hall of Fame.

Playing career

High school
Holland is a graduate of Hempstead High School in Hempstead, Texas.   While attending Hempstead High, Holland was a letterman in several sports. He became an All-State player in both football and basketball while simultaneously becoming a top-10 student.  Holland is the first of only two Hempstead High School alumni to play in the NFL, the other being Harvey Williams.

College
Prior to his pro-football career, Holland was a four-year letterman at Texas A&M University in College Station, Texas.  There he was a three-year starter and was Texas A&M's all-time leading tackler until his record was broken in 1998 by Dat Nguyen.

NFL

Holland was a second-round draft pick for the Green Bay Packers in 1987.  He posted over 100 tackles for six consecutive seasons while playing for Green Bay.  He retired from play after the 1993 season.

Coaching career
After retiring as a linebacker for Green Bay, Holland moved on to an NFL coaching career, beginning his coaching career as a defensive quality control coach for the Green Bay Packers from 1995 to 1997.  He went on to coach special teams in 1998 and linebackers in 1999.  He helped to lead the Packers to back-to-back NFC championships following the 1995 and 1996 seasons and an NFL championship in Super Bowl XXXI.

In 2000, Holland moved on to the Seattle Seahawks, where he served as the assistant special teams and assistant strength and conditioning coach.  He returned to his more familiar role as linebackers coach in 2001 and 2002.  For the 2003 season, Holland moved to the Detroit Lions.  In Detroit, he was defensive assistant coach from 2003 to 2004 and linebackers coach in 2005.  Holland returned his home state of Texas in 2006.  He was the linebackers coach for the Houston Texans until being fired in 2011.

In 2012, Holland  was hired by new Raiders head coach Dennis Allen to coach the team's linebackers. On December 31, 2012, he was relieved of his duties.  Holland joined the BC Lions of the Canadian Football League (CFL) as a linebackers coach on February 19, 2014, after 17 years of coaching in the NFL.  He returned to the NFL in 2016 as linebackers coach of the Cleveland Browns under head coach Hue Jackson.

Family
Holland is married to Faith Holland and is the father of Jordan Holland and Joli Holland.

References

External links
 San Francisco 49ers profile

1965 births
Living people
American football linebackers
BC Lions coaches
Cleveland Browns coaches
Detroit Lions coaches
Green Bay Packers coaches
Green Bay Packers players
Houston Texans coaches
Seattle Seahawks coaches
Sportspeople from the Houston metropolitan area
Texas A&M Aggies football players
Virginia Destroyers coaches
San Francisco 49ers coaches
All-American college football players
People from Bellville, Texas
People from Hempstead, Texas
Players of American football from Texas
African-American coaches of American football
African-American coaches of Canadian football
African-American players of American football
21st-century African-American people
20th-century African-American sportspeople
Ed Block Courage Award recipients